Rodrigo Laviņš (born August 3, 1974) is a Latvian former professional ice hockey defenceman.

Playing career
Laviņš began his career with his hometown team Pārdaugava Rīga. He then moved to North America in 1994, starting with the East Coast Hockey League where he played for the Raleigh IceCaps and the Tallahassee Tiger Sharks. He also had a spell in the Colonial Hockey League with the Muskegon Fury. In 1997, he moved to the International Hockey League with the Las Vegas Thunder. He then moved to the Tacoma Sabercats of the West Coast Hockey League the same season.

Laviņš returned to Europe in 1998, splitting the year in Finland's SM-liiga with Jokerit and Sweden's Elitserien with AIK. He returned to Finland the next season, splitting the year with HPK and Ilves before moving to the Deutsche Eishockey Liga in Germany, suiting up for the Augsburger Panther. Laviņš returned to Russia in 2001 where he spent two seasons, playing for Molot-Prikamye Perm and Dynamo Moscow.

He returned to Latvia in 2003, signing with HK Riga 2000 where he stayed for three seasons. He came back to Sweden in 2005, joining Brynäs IF for two seasons and then split 2007-08 with Södertälje SK and Russian side Metallurg Novokuznetsk.

In the 2008–09 season, he will play for Dinamo Riga in the newly formed Kontinental Hockey League.

International
He was named to the Latvia men's national ice hockey team for competition at the 2014 IIHF World Championship.

Career statistics

Regular season and playoffs

International

References

External links

1974 births
Augsburger Panther players
Brynäs IF players
Dinamo Riga players
Expatriate ice hockey players in Russia
HC Dynamo Moscow players
Metallurg Novokuznetsk players
HK Liepājas Metalurgs players
HPK players
Ice hockey players at the 2002 Winter Olympics
Ice hockey players at the 2006 Winter Olympics
Ice hockey players at the 2010 Winter Olympics
Ilves players
Jokerit players
Las Vegas Thunder players
Latvian ice hockey defencemen
Living people
Molot-Prikamye Perm players
Muskegon Fury players
Olympic ice hockey players of Latvia
Raleigh IceCaps players
Södertälje SK players
Ice hockey people from Riga
Tacoma Sabercats players
Tallahassee Tiger Sharks players
Empire State Cobras players